

One Way Ticket may refer to:

Music

Songs
"One Way Ticket" (Neil Sedaka song), a 1959 song by Neil Sedaka, covered by Barry Blue and Eruption
"One Way Ticket" (Stephen Lawrence song), a 1967 song by Gloria Loring, covered by Helen Reddy and Mama Cass
 "One Way Ticket" (Aretha Franklin song), a song from Franklin's 1970 album Spirit in the Dark
"One Way Ticket (Because I Can)", a 1996 song by LeAnn Rimes
"One Way Ticket" (The Darkness song), 2005

Albums
One Way Ticket (album), a 1994 album by Luciano
One Way Ticket, a 2012 album by Curt Chambers

Film and television
One Way Ticket (1935 film), a 1935 American film by Herbert Biberman
One Way Ticket (1988 film), a 1988 Dominican film
One Way Ticket (1997 film), a 1997 Australian made-for-television film
One Way Ticket (2008 film), a 2008 Indian Malayalam-language film 
One Way Ticket (2016 film), a 2016 Indian Marathi-language film
One Way Ticket (TV series), a 2012 Pakistani comedy television series
"One Way Ticket" (Miami Vice), an episode of Miami Vice